Surya Satakam is a 7th-century Sanskrit verses created in praise of Hindu Sun God, Lord Surya by Mayurbhatta.

Mayurbhatta was suffering from leprosy. He performed penance at famous Deo Surya Mandir located at Deo in present-day Aurangabad district, Bihar. He composed one hundred verses in praise of Lord Surya - the Sun God, and was cured of leprosy. While he was composing the verses, he was troubled by Brahmarakṣasa but he was able to defeat him and please the Sun God. The hundred verses he composed in praise of Lord Surya became famous as Surya Satakam.Satakam in Sanskrit means hundred.

The first two verse of Surya Satakam are as follows. Due to famous first stanza of verse, Surya Satakam is also commonly known as Aadidev Namastubhyam Shloka:-

See also
Multan Sun Temple

References

Hindu texts
Sanskrit texts
History of Bihar